Nyctemera latimargo is a moth of the family Erebidae. It is found in Papua, where it has been recorded from the Snow Mountains and the Baliem Valley. It is found at altitudes ranging from sea level to 2,100 meters.

The length of the forewings is 20–21 mm. The forewings are dark brown, the basal half with white veins. The wingfold and longitudinal line in the cell are also white. The fascia are narrow and crossed by dark brown veins. The hindwings have a broad dark brown hindmargin.

References

Nyctemerina
Moths described in 1915